Mictopsichia torresi is a species of moth of the family Tortricidae. It is found in Ecuador.

The wingspan is about 15 mm. The ground colour of the forewings is yellow cream, preserved in the costal area and medially where it is suffused orange between the markings. These markings are brown and tinged orange at places. The hindwings are pale orange with brown spots in the apical area and red orange spots in the anal and posterior areas.

Etymology
The species is named in honour of Ing. Salazar Torres.

References

Moths described in 2010
Mictopsichia
Moths of South America
Taxa named by Józef Razowski